Henri Nikkanen (born April 28, 2001) is a Finnish professional ice hockey centre currently playing for the Manitoba Moose in the American Hockey League (AHL) as a prospect to the Winnipeg Jets of the National Hockey League (NHL).

Playing career
Nikkanen made his Liiga debut for his hometown team Jukurit during the 2018–19 Liiga season. He played nine regular season games and scored two goals. He was drafted 113th overall by the Winnipeg Jets in the 2019 NHL Entry Draft.

On 15 April 2021, Nikkanen left Jukurit to sign a two-year contract with fellow Liiga club, Lahti Pelicans. In the 2021–22 season, Nikkanen made 60 appearances in his lone season with the Pelicans, contributing with 7 goals and 12 points.

On 10 April 2022, Nikkanen was signed to a three-year, entry-level contract with draft club, the Winnipeg Jets. He immediately joined AHL affiliate, the Manitoba Moose for the remainder of the season.

Career statistics

Regular season and playoffs

International

References

External links

2001 births
Living people
Finnish ice hockey centres
Imatran Ketterä players
Lahti Pelicans players
Manitoba Moose players
Mikkelin Jukurit players
People from Mikkeli
Winnipeg Jets draft picks
Sportspeople from South Savo